Hurvin Anderson (born 1965) is a British painter.

Early life and education
Hurvin Anderson was born in Birmingham, England in 1965. He was educated at Wimbledon College of Art, London and The Royal College of Art, London.

Career
Anderson often works from photographs and his own memories to create works that range from delicate paintings on vellum to large canvases that can consume an entire wall. His paintings and works on paper "depict places where memory and history converge" and engage with issues of identity and representation. While recent works, such as Studio Drawing 15 (2016) mark a shift toward abstraction in his oeuvre, the motifs of the barbershop, densely layered trees, and Caribbean landscapes have been consistently featured throughout most of his career.

Anderson is represented by Thomas Dane Gallery in London and Michael Werner Gallery in New York.

Exhibitions 
His work has been exhibited in group and solo exhibitions in the UK and the US, including at Tate Britain, London, Ikon Gallery, Birmingham, the Studio Museum, Harlem, New York and the Art Gallery of Ontario.

Selected solo exhibitions 

Foreign Body, Michael Werner Gallery, New York (2016)

Backdrop, Art Gallery of Ontario (AGO), Toronto (2016)

Dub Versions, New Art Exchange, Nottingham (2016)

Backdrop, CAM, St. Louis (2015)

Reporting Back, Ikon Gallery, Birmingham (2013)

Subtitles, Michael Werner Gallery, New York (2011)

Art Now: Hurvin Anderson, Tate Britain, London (2009)

Peter’s Series 2007–09, Studio Museum Harlem, New York (2009)

Selected group exhibitions 

Turner Prize 2017, Ferens Art Gallery, Hull (2017)

Jamaican Pulse: Art and Politics from Jamaica and the Diaspora, Royal West of England Academy, Bristol (2016)

Making & Unmaking, Camden Arts Centre, London (2016)

Poetics of Relation, Pérez Art Museum, Miami (2015)

Homebodies, Museum of Contemporary Art, Chicago (2013)

Self-Consciousness, curated by Hilton Als and Peter Doig, VW (VeneKlasen/Werner), Berlin (2010)

Telling Times, Leicester Museum and Art Gallery, Leicester (2000)

Inheritance, Ikon Touring, Birmingham (1995)

Awards
In 2017 Anderson was nominated for the Turner Prize at the age of 52. Previously, only artists under the age of 50 were eligible for nominating, but that rule has since been abolished.

Anderson received the first TenTen artist commission in 2018.

Residencies and fellowships 
2009: Artists in residence, Headlands Center for the Arts, Sausalito
2005: Artist in residence, Dulwich Picture Gallery, London
2002: Artist in residence, Caribbean Contemporary Arts, Port of Spain, Trinidad
1990–2000: Cheltenham Fine Art Research Fellow in Painting, Cheltenham and Gloucester College of Higher Education

Bibliography
 Hurvin Anderson: Foreign Bodies, Michael Werner Gallery, New York, 2016
 Hurvin Anderson: Backdrop, CAM, St. Louis, 2016. Texts by Duro Olowu and Jeffrey Uslip. 
 Hurvin Anderson: Reporting Back, Ikon Gallery, Birmingham, 2013. Texts by Eddie Chambers, Jennifer Higgie and Jonathan Watkins. 
 Hurvin Anderson: Subtitles, Michael Werner Gallery, New York, 2011. Text by Matthew Higgs.
 Hurvin Anderson a View of the Rio Cobre, Dulwich Picture Gallery, London, 2006. Text by Ian A. C. Dejardin.

References

External links

1965 births
English people of Jamaican descent
20th-century British painters
English male painters
21st-century British painters
Black British artists
Alumni of the Royal College of Art
People from Birmingham, West Midlands
Living people
British contemporary artists